Mahesh Bhupathi and Rohan Bopanna were the defending champions but decided not to participate together.
Bopanna played alongside Rajeev Ram, while Bhupathi partnered up with Michaël Llodra.  The two teams met in the semifinals, with Bhupathi and Llodra winning.  Bhupathi and Llodra went on to win the title, defeating Robert Lindstedt and Nenad Zimonjić in the final, 7–6(8–6), 7–6(8–6).

Seeds

Draw

Draw

References
 Main Draw

Dubai Tennis Championships - Doubles
2013 Doubles